PhoneFactor is a multi-factor authentication system which utilizes phone calls to verify identity.  With multiple out-of-band methods (phone call, text message, and push) and an OATH passcode option, PhoneFactor provides flexibility for users and a single multi-factor platform for IT to manage.

PhoneFactor was founded as Positive Networks Inc. in 2001 by Tim Sutton and Steve Dispensa. The PhoneFactor product was launched by Positive Networks in 2007, and the company changed their name to PhoneFactor Inc. in 2009.   On October 4, 2012, Microsoft acquired PhoneFactor, and the PhoneFactor service is now available as Azure Multi-Factor Authentication. In addition to securing on-premises applications and identities, the service now also works with cloud applications like Office 365 that use Windows Azure Active Directory.

References

Identity documents